Aomori Broadcasting Corporation  (RAB, 青森放送株式会社, Aomori Hōsō Kabushiki Gaisha) is a television and radio broadcaster in Aomori, Japan.  It is affiliated with  Japan Radio Network (JRN), National Radio Network (NRN), Nippon News Network (NNN) and Nippon Television Network System (NNS).

As the prefecture doesn't have an FNN/FNS affiliate, RAB alongside ATV & ABA air certain Fuji TV programming.

History

Launch as radio broadcaster 
There were initial attempts to establish a commercial broadcaster in the prefecture in December 1947, which was then supported with the passage of the "Three Radio Laws" (Radio Law, Broadcasting Law, and Radio Supervisory Committee Establishment Law) in 1950.

At that time, there were competition for private broadcasting license between Radio Tohoku (not related to the former name of Akita Broadcasting), an unnamed local newspaper in Aomori, and Tohoku Broadcasting. In April 1953, Tohoku Radio and Tohoku Broadcasting made a settlement, and Tohoku Broadcasting cancelled its application for a broadcasting license in Aomori Prefecture, and the two cooperated fully.  In August of the same year, Radio Tohoku received its broadcasting license which was then renamed to Radio Aomori on September 26.

Radio Aomori was then established on September 30, 1953. A day before its establishment, they conducted trial radio broadcasts. On October 12, 1953, Radio Aomori officially started broadcasting. Upon its launch, Radio Aomori wasn't receivable to southern parts of the prefecture. This was later resolved when the Hirosaki relay transmitter was opened in 1956. According to a survey conducted by the local government of Aomori Prefecture in 1957, Radio Aomori accounted for 76.2% in audience share compared to NHK Radio 1's 21%.

Expansion to TV broadcasting and further developments on radio 
Radio Aomori started preparing to broadcast on TV since August 1955, and obtained a TV broadcast license in October 1957. They conducted trial broadcasts on September 14, 1959, and officially started TV broadcasting on October 1 of the same year. RAB initially intended to join JNN. However, before it started broadcasting it was discovered that Nippon TV were the most favorable. In October 1961 to reflect the rapid development of their television broadcasting, Aomori Radio changed its name to Aomori Broadcasting. In 1965, RAB joined the JRN and NRN networks at the same time, avoiding costs of having another AM radio station in the prefecture.

RAB started color TV broadcasting in 1966 and expanded 24 hour broadcasts in May 1970. On April 1, 1975, RAB started airing TV Asahi programming as it joined ANN after ATV withdrew from being an ANN affiliate. RAB then withdrew from airing ANN programming when Asahi Broadcasting Aomori opened on October 1, 1991, and continued to air Fuji TV programming.

In 1991, RAB won 7 awards in the 1991 Japan Commercial Broadcasters Association Award. Since Video Research started conducting rating surveys in Aomori on 1989, RAB continued to be number 1 in terms of TV rating.

Broadcasting

Radio
RAB Radio
 Aomori 1233 kHz JOGR; 91.7 MHz FM
 Hachinohe 1485 kHz JOGO; 92.7 MHz FM
 Hirosaki 1215 kHz JOGE
 Fukaura 1485 kHz
 Towada 1485 kHz
 Noheji 1062 kHz

Analog TV
JOGR-TV - RAB Television
 Aomori(Main Station) 1ch
 Hachinohe 11ch
 Mutsu 10ch
 Fukaura 6ch
 Iwasaki 1ch
 Kodomari 11ch
 Shiranuka 1ch
 Tomari 10ch
 Oma 1ch
 Shichinohe 10ch
 Owani 11ch
 Takko 57ch
 Kamikita 53ch
 Imabetsu 54ch
 Sai 42ch
 Hachinohe-Sawasato 41ch
 Towada 45ch
 Goshogawara 44ch
 Asamushi 54ch
 Kasose 50ch
 etc...

Digital TV(ID:1) 
JOGR-DTV - RAB Digital Television
 Aomori 28Ch
 Hachinohe 22Ch
 Kamikita 26Ch
 Mutsu 43Ch
 Fukaura 26Ch
 Owani 20Ch
 etc...

Radio&TV common
 Touou Nippou NEWS
 RAB NEWS(Only special program schedules)
 Aomori Prefectural Ekiden(September 1stSunday)
 Day of Tsugaru dialect

Radio
 Morning Wide! Dash
 Today's Asapuri
 GO!GO! Radimaru
 RAB News Lader
 ShioriAso's Saturday is kyun
 ShuetsuTokaichi's Saturday-alley
 Saturday is DON
 RAB Ear's newspaper
 etc...

past
 Goodmorning wide Aomori
 Aomori today
 Saturday Dreaming Radio
 Heartfull Saturday
 Pit in Saturday
 Night bridge for you

TV
 RAB News Ladar - news every. -
 Monday information-stools
 ZIP! FRIDAY

past
 Goodmorning hot studio(Saturday)
 Friday wide Aomori (only Friday)
 Chau-chau 15(30)minutes(except Friday)

Item
 Too Nippo

Rival stations 
Aomori Television(ATV)
Asahi Broadcasting Aomori(ABA)
Aomori FM Broadcasting(AFB)

References

External links
 RAB HomePage

Companies based in Aomori Prefecture
Television stations in Japan
Radio in Japan
Nippon News Network
Mass media in Aomori (city)
Television channels and stations established in 1959